Amarildo Dimo (born 25 August 1982) is an Albanian footballer who has played as a defender for Albanian club Egnatia.

Club career
On 5 January 2015, Dimo returned to his hometown club Apolonia Fier after 15 years, join the Albanian Superliga strugglers until the end of the season in their bid to escape relegation. He officially become a free agent on 1 July 2018 after his contract run out and the club decided not to offer him the renew, thus leaving the club after three-and-a-half seasons.

In July 2018, Dimo signed with fellow Albanian First Division side Egnatia. He was given squad number 22 and made his competitive debut in the opening matchday of 2018–19 Albanian First Division against Bylis Ballsh where he scored the match's only goal. The goal was followed by another one in the second matchday, a 2–1 win at Elbasani which gave Egnatia the championship lead with Dimo netting the opener with a penalty kick.

Honours
Skënderbeu Korçë
 Albanian Superliga: 2011–12, 2012–13, 2013–14
 Albanian Supercup: 2013, 2014

References

External links

1982 births
Living people
Sportspeople from Fier
Albanian people of Argentine descent
Albanian footballers
Association football defenders
Luftëtari Gjirokastër players
KF Bylis Ballsh players
KF Skënderbeu Korçë players
KF Apolonia Fier players
KS Egnatia Rrogozhinë players
Kategoria Superiore players
Kategoria e Parë players